Tamara Korpatsch won the title, defeating Emma Navarro in the final, 6–4, 6–1.

Beatriz Haddad Maia was the defending champion but chose not to participate.

Seeds

Draw

Finals

Top half

Bottom half

References

External Links
Main Draw

Elle Spirit Open - Singles